Zvezde Granda ("Grand Stars") is a Serbian singing competition show, created by Saša Popović and produced by Grand Production. The show began airing in 2004 on RTV Pink. Zvezde Granda made its move to Prva in 2014, before eventually returning back to Pink in 2022. The series has also been broadcast on several other networks in the western Balkans. Zvezde Granda are considerate to be one of the longest-running and most-watched reality television shows in Serbia.

The show has declared the following 16 winners over its 15 seasons: Branislav Mojićević, Milica Todorović, Dušan Svilar, Darko Lazić, Stefan Petrušić, Darko Martinović, Amar Gile, Mirza Selimović, Haris Berković, Ibro Bublin, Aleksa Perović, Riste Risteski, Anid Ćušić, Džejla Ramović, Mahir Mulalić and Nermin Handžić. In addition to winners, Zvzede Granda has launched the careers of numerous other regionally poplar singers, which include: Tanja Savić, Darko Filipović, Renato Henc, Rada Manojlović, Milan Stanković, Jelena Kostov, Milica Pavlović, Vanja Mijatović, Aleksandra Prijović, Katarina Grujić, Andreana Čekić, Tea Tairović, Teodora Džehverović and Aleksandra Mladenović.

Format
Before the show starts recording, potential contestants are scouted by Grand Production through an audition process. Zvezde Granda is consisted of around six rounds where contestants sing one or two songs and are judged by the main judging panel, based on their performance. The first round used to be a blind audition, where the singers are judged exclusively based on their vocal performance. If they receive more than a half of the judges' votes, the contestant may choose their future mentor from the judges who voted for them. However, the judges are allowed to decline the mentorship over a contestant. The judging panel can also use the "panic button" to cut the contestant's performance short. In the following rounds, contestants continue performing, now with the help and training from their mentors, solo or against other contestants, and are judged by the other mentors.

Ultimately, the last remaining contestants enter the grand final, where they face the public vote, which decides the season's winner. In past seasons, the final was held in large indoor venues in the region, like the Belgrade Arena, Boris Trajkovski Sports Center and Zetra Olympic Hall. The winner of Zvezde Granda receives a recording and management contract with Grand Production, as well as other rewards, such as an apartment or a car.

Judges 
Since 2013, the show has included a permanent judging panel, which was initially consisted of songwriter and accordion player Dragan Stojković Bosanac and singers Zorica Brunclik, Aca Lukas, Šaban Šaulić and Snežana Đurišić. Zvezde Granda have also featured a production panel, which was initially composed of Grand Production's key people Saša Popović, Lepa Brena and Saša Jakšić. Since season 13, the judges have also served as mentors to the contestants. Currently, as of season 16, the main judging panel is composed of Dragan Stojković Bosanac, singers Ana Bekuta, Marija Šerifović, Viki Miljković, Đorđe David and Svetlana Ceca Ražnatović, while Popović, Đurišić and Aleksandar Milić Mili pose as the production panel. However, the latter two also act as mentors.

Zvezde Granda have also seen a number of different presenters throughout the seasons. Initially, the show was hosted by Saša Popović. The longest serving and current presenters are Voja Nedeljković and Sanja Kužet.

Series overview
To date, 15 series have been broadcast, as summarised below.
 Winning contestant

Regional broadcasts

References

External links
Zvezde Granda

Serbian music industry
Nova S original programming
Music competitions
Serbian talent shows
2000s Serbian television series
2010s Serbian television series